Fennec or Fennek may refer to:

Arts and Entertainment
 Fennec (TV series), a French 1998 cartoon series
 Fennec Shand, a bounty huntress in the Star Wars universe
 Silas Fennec, a character in China Miéville's novel The Scar

Science
 Fennec (climate program), a climate program in the central Sahara
 Fennec fox, a small nocturnal fox found in the Sahara desert

Other uses
 Fennec, the libre fork of Firefox for Android, a web browser
 Les Fennecs, a nickname for the Algeria national football team

Military vehicles 
 T-28S Fennec, a variant of the T-28 Trojan piston-engined aeroplane
 Eurocopter Fennec, a lightweight helicopter
 LGS Fennek, a four-wheeled armed reconnaissance vehicle

See also